The Central African Republic competed at the 2018 Summer Youth Olympics in Buenos Aires, Argentina from 6 October to 18 October 2018.

Competitors

Athletics

Boys

Swimming

The Central African Republic qualified 1 athlete for swimming at the games. 

Girls

References

2018 in Central African Republic sport
Nations at the 2018 Summer Youth Olympics
Central African Republic at the Youth Olympics